Ronald J. Bacigal is an American legal scholar and professor of law at the University of Richmond School of Law. He is "nationally recognized as one of the leading scholars of Fourth Amendment Law."

Bacigal graduated from Concord University and Washington and Lee University School of Law. In addition, he spent time at The Hague as a Fulbright Scholar. Professor Bacigal has taught at Richmond since 1971 and has been a professor since 1973. He is the reporter for criminal law decisions of the Court of Appeals of Virginia.

He has earned a number of awards, including the 2008 Harry L. Carrico Professionalism Award (presented by the Virginia State Bar), the Outstanding Faculty Award from the Virginia State Council of Higher Education in 1990, and is a two-time recipient of the University of Richmond Distinguished Educator Award. Bacigal has authored a number of texts used in both educational and legal settings, including Criminal Procedure: Cases, Problems, Exercises (West Publishing Co. 3rd ed. 2007) (2nd ed. 2004) (1sted. 2001) (with four other authors and annual supplements) and Criminal Law and Procedure: An Introduction (West Publishing Co. 2nd ed. 2001)(1st ed. 1996), May It Please The Court: A Biography of Judge Robert R. Merhige, Jr. (University Press of America 1992), The Limits of Litigation: The Dalkon Shield Controversy (Carolina Academic Press 1990) and many books concerning Virginia law and procedure. He has also published numerous papers.

Notes

Living people
Washington and Lee University School of Law alumni
University of Richmond faculty
Concord University alumni
American legal scholars
Year of birth missing (living people)